Nasi kapau is a Minangkabau steamed rice topped with various choices of dishes originated from Nagari Kapau, Bukittinggi, a tourism and culinary hotspot town in West Sumatra, Indonesia. It is often describes as Minang version of nasi ramas or nasi campur (mixed rice).

A nasi kapau foodstall usually consists of stages and rows of large bowls, plates or saucepans filled with various dishes. In nasi kapau food stalls, after the customer is seated, they are asked which dishes they desire. The waiter then prepared steaming hot rice on plate with cubadak (unripe jackfruit gulai), and boiled cassava leaf, and sambal aside.  The chosen dishes will be put directly — using long serving spoon — upon the steamed rice or in separate small plates. Nasi kapau eating establishments usually insist on using high quality fragrant rice. High quality Kapau rice directly brought from Bukittinggi and Agam Regency.

In Minang food establishments, it is common to eat with one's hands. They usually provide kobokan, a bowl of tap water with a slice of lime in it to give a fresh scent. This water is used to wash one's hands before and after eating. If a customer does not wish to eat with bare hands, it is acceptable to ask for a spoon and fork.

Dishes

Nasi kapau dishes are actually quite similar or almost identical with nasi padang from Padang city. The differences mainly lies in the method of serving, and sometimes there are some typical Kapau Bukittinggi dishes that seldom served in common Padang restaurant. The dishes offered in nasi kapau are:

 Rendang, chunks of beef stewed in spicy coconut milk and chili gravy, cooked well until dried. Other than beef, rendang ayam (chicken rendang) and rendang itik (duck rendang) can be found.   
 Daun ubi tumbuk, cassava leaves in coconut milk        
 Kalio, similar to rendang; while rendang is rather dry, kalio is watery and light-colored
 Gulai ayam, chicken gulai
 Gulai cancang, gulai of meats and cow internal organs
 Gulai tunjang, gulai of cow foot tendons
 Gulai babek, gulai babat or gulai paruik kabau, gulai of cow tripes
 Gulai iso or gulai usus, gulai of cow intestines usually filled with eggs and tofu
 Gulai impo, gulai of cow spleen
 Gulai ati, gulai of cow liver
 Gulai otak, gulai of cow brain
 Gulai sumsum, gulai of cow bone marrow
 Gulai gajeboh, cow fat gulai 
 Gulai itiak, duck gulai  
 Gulai talua, boiled eggs gulai  
 Gulai kepala ikan kakap merah, red snapper's head gulai 
 Gulai jariang, jengkol stinky bean gulai 
 Dendeng batokok, thin crispy beef  
 Dendeng balado, thin crispy beef with chili
 Paru goreng, fried cow lung   
 Ayam bakar, grilled spicy chicken
 Ayam goreng, fried chicken with spicy granules
 Ayam pop, Minang style chicken, boiled/steamed and later fried. While fried chicken is golden brown, ayam pop is light-colored.
 Ikan bilih, fried small freshwater fish of the genus Mystacoleucus
 Baluik goreng, crispy fried small freshwater eel
 Udang balado, shrimp in chili
 Rajungan goreng, crispy fried crab 
 Terong balado, eggplant in chili
 Petai goreng, fried green stinky bean (Parkia speciosa)
 Ikan asam padeh
 Peyek udang, shrimp rempeyek
 Kerupuk jangek, cow's skin krupuk
 Sambal balado, sambal with large sliced chilli pepper
 Sambal lado tanak

See also

 Cuisine of Indonesia
 Nasi campur
 Nasi kari
 Nasi padang
 Nasi uduk
 Nasi ulam

References

Padang cuisine
Indonesian rice dishes